A ring forming reaction or ring-closing reaction in organic chemistry is a general term for a variety of reactions that introduce one or more rings into a molecule.  A heterocycle forming reaction is such a reaction that introduces a new heterocycle.
Important classes of ring forming reactions include annulations and cycloadditions.

Named ring forming reactions
Named ring forming reactions include (not exhaustive):
Azide-alkyne Huisgen cycloaddition
Bischler–Napieralski reaction
Bucherer carbazole synthesis
Danheiser annulation
Dieckmann condensation
Diels–Alder reaction
Feist–Benary synthesis
Fiesselmann thiophene synthesis
Fischer indole synthesis
Gewald reaction
Hantzsch pyridine synthesis
Larock indole synthesis
Paal–Knorr synthesis
Pictet–Spengler reaction
Pomeranz–Fritsch reaction
Ring-closing metathesis
Robinson annulation
Skraup reaction

References

Further reading
 Michael B. Smith & Jerry March, 2007, "March's Advanced Organic Chemistry: Reactions, Mechanisms, and Structure," 6th Ed., New York, NY, USA:Wiley & Sons, see , accessed 19 June 2015.
 László Kürti & Barbara Czakó, 2005, "Strategic Applications of Named Reactions in Organic Synthesis: Background and Detailed Mechanisms, Amsterdam, NH, NLD:Elsevier Academic Press, 2005ISBN 0124297854, see , accessed 19 June 2015.

Chemical reactions
Ring forming reactions